WCLJ-TV (channel 42) is a television station licensed to Bloomington, Indiana, United States, serving the Indianapolis area as an affiliate of the digital multicast network Bounce TV. It is owned by Inyo Broadcast Holdings alongside Ion Television affiliate WIPX-TV (channel 63, also licensed to Bloomington). WCLJ-TV and WIPX-TV share offices on Production Drive (near I-74/I-465) in southwestern Indianapolis; through a channel sharing agreement, the two stations transmit using WIPX-TV's spectrum from an antenna on SR 252 in Trafalgar, Indiana.

History

The station was built by the Trinity Broadcasting Network (TBN) and first signed on the air on August 27, 1987.

TBN entered into an agreement with Ion Media Networks on November 14, 2017, which gave Ion the option to acquire the licenses of WCLJ-TV and three other TBN stations that had sold their spectrum in the Federal Communications Commission (FCC)'s spectrum auction. Ion exercised the option on May 24, 2018. The sale was completed on September 25, 2018, creating a duopoly with existing Ion Television station WIPX-TV. Ion immediately moved Ion Life (later Ion Plus) to the station in order to provide the network with full-market coverage equivalent to that of WIPX-DT1.

On February 27, 2021, the date Ion Plus ceased broadcasting, WCLJ switched to Bounce TV, sharing the affiliation with WNDY-DT2.

Technical information

Subchannel

On June 1, 2015, JUCE and Smile of a Child were consolidated into a single network on the third subchannel to accommodate the addition of a new network, TBN Salsa, on the fifth subchannel where Smile of a Child used to reside. As a result of the change, children's programming that previously aired on Smile of a Child was carried on 42.3 from 7 a.m. to 7 p.m. On April 1, 2018, the channel switched off its non-shared signal, leaving it to air only on its new frequency shared with WIPX-TV.

Analog-to-digital conversion
WCLJ-TV shut down its analog signal, over UHF channel 42, on February 17, 2009, earlier than the June 12, 2009 official date in which full-power television stations in the United States transitioned from analog to digital broadcasts under federal mandate. The station's digital signal relocated from its pre-transition UHF channel 56, which was among the high band UHF channels (52-69) that were removed from broadcasting use as a result of the transition, to its analog-era frequency, UHF channel 42.

References

External links

Bounce TV affiliates
Mass media in Indianapolis
Television channels and stations established in 1987
1987 establishments in Indiana
CLJ-TV